Koiliomenos (also known as Agios Nikolaos) is a settlement on Zakynthos island,  Greece. It is located 3 kilometers southwest of Machairado and 11 kilometers southwest of Zakynthos City. In 1981, the population of Koiliomenos was around 463 inhabitants. In 1991, the population declined slightly to around 450 inhabitants.

External links
Greek Travel Pages - Kiliomeno

Populated places in Zakynthos